The Heart of Christmas is a 2011 American Christian drama film directed by Gary Wheeler. It stars  Candace Cameron Bure, Erin Bethea, Jeanne Neilson, Eric Jay Beck, George Newbern, and Matthew West. Based on a true story, the film involves a woman's encounter with a family caring for a child with acute leukemia and how it transforms her faith and her attitude about her own family.

Plot 
Megan Walsh is a successful businesswoman who does not seem to have enough time for her husband and two children. While taking her children trick-or-treating during Halloween, she encounters a confusing situation in which many families are decorating for Christmas (which is nearly two months away). Their explanation is that they are trying to provide one last Christmas for Dax Locke, a toddler in their neighborhood who is dying of a rare form of leukemia. Curious, Megan reads Dax's mother Julie's blog and learns about the Lockes' journey. Inspired, Megan examines her own life and priorities.

Cast 
Candace Cameron Bure as Megan Walsh 
Jeanne Neilson as Julie Locke 
Eric Jay Beck as Austin Locke
Erin Bethea as Trish Hurtgren
Matthew West as Mark Hurtgren
Christopher Shone as Dax Locke 
George Newbern as Dr. Don Sandler
Nicholas Shone as Dax Locke 
Dendrie Taylor as Michelle Denford
Anita Renfroe as Theresa 
Burgess Jenkins as Walt Walsh
Brooke Bryan as Emma Walsh
Hayden & Christian Nelson as Jackson Walsh
Bruce Marchiano as Dr. McDowell

Reception 
The film does not appear to have received reviews by any major professional film critics. Rotten Tomatoes has no rating for the movie. Scott Rolfe at The Dove Foundation website assigns the film 5 stars out of 5, although this may reflect its acceptability for the foundation's wholesomeness for family viewing.

Release 
It received a worldwide television premiere on December 4, 2012, on Gospel Music Channel (GMC).

See also
 
 List of Christmas films

References

External links
 
 

2011 television films
2011 films
2010s Christmas drama films
American television films
American Christmas drama films
Christmas television films
Drama films based on actual events
Films about cancer
2010s American films